Daylight/Twilight Alternative High School is a four-year alternative public high school that serves students in ninth through twelfth grades from Trenton, in Mercer County, New Jersey, United States, operating as part of the Trenton Public Schools. The school offers daytime programs for students who have faced challenges in the traditional school setting, as well as evening programs for those ages 21 and older. A 30/60 day course program offers six cycles throughout the year in which students take a four-hour core course on a daily basis for 30 days while also taking a two-hour elective for 60 days in each cycle.

As of the 2021–22 school year, the school had an enrollment of 466 students and 39.5 classroom teachers (on an FTE basis), for a student–teacher ratio of 11.8:1. There were 148 students (31.8% of enrollment) eligible for free lunch and none eligible for reduced-cost lunch.

Administration
The principal is Ronald Edwards.

References

External links 

Trenton Public Schools

School Data for the Trenton Public Schools, National Center for Education Statistics

Alternative schools in the United States
High schools in Trenton, New Jersey
Public high schools in Mercer County, New Jersey